In computing, an office suite is a collection of productivity software usually containing at least a word processor, spreadsheet and a presentation program. There are many different brands and types of office suites. Popular office suites include Microsoft Office, Google Workspace and LibreOffice.

Multi-platform desktop office suites

Free and open source suites
 Apache OpenOffice (descended from OpenOffice.org)
 Calligra Suite – the continuation of KOffice under a new name
Collabora Online for desktops is an enterprise-ready edition of LibreOffice
 LibreOffice – independent fork of OpenOffice.org with a number of enhancements
 ONLYOFFICE Desktop Editors – an open source offline edition

Freeware and proprietary suites
 Hancom Office Suite (formerly ThinkFree Office) - Available for Windows and Mac.
 MobiSystems OfficeSuite – available for Windows, Android and iOS.
 Polaris Office - Available for Windows, Android, iOS and macOS.
 SoftMaker Office – For a fee; a slightly feature-limited version is free under the name "FreeOffice". Available for Windows, Linux and Mac (2018)
 WPS Office – free and complete office suite, covering a multitude of operating system platforms including Windows, Linux, Android, iOS and Mac.
 Yozo Office (formerly EIOffice and Evermore Integrated Office) – Available in Polish, English, Japanese & French for Windows & Linux using Java.

For Microsoft Windows only

Free and open source suites

Freeware and proprietary suites

 Ability Office
 Breadbox Office – DOS software, but has been successfully tested with Windows 3.x, Windows 95/98/98 SE/ME, Windows NT 4.0, Windows 2000 and the 32-bit versions of Windows XP, Vista and 7.
 EasyOffice
 Framework – historical but also still supported for Windows by the present developer, Selection & Functions Inc.
 Gobe Productive – Originally written for BeOS by developers of the original ClarisWorks, GoBe Productive is a lightweight integrated Works-like office suite with a generous "Hassle-Free License."
 Hancom Office
 Ichitaro JUST Suite 2008 – a full Japanese-language suite from JustSystems, the most direct competitor to Microsoft Office in Japan. For Windows only.
 Microsoft Office – Note that the Windows version has a slightly different feature set than the Mac version, which is named "Microsoft Office for Mac" (see Office suites for Mac OS X only section below).
 WordPerfect Office

For DOS

Proprietary suites
 Breadbox Office – a word processor, spreadsheet, address book and drawing program. It is part of a broader software package called Breadbox Ensemble which also includes programs such as email, web-browser and HTML editor. Breadbox Ensemble runs under the GEOS (16-bit operating system) and effectively requires a version of DOS to be installed on the host system.
 Corel WordPerfect for DOS – a word processor, spreadsheet, and presentation software from Corel (containing WordPerfect 6.2, Quattro Pro 5.6, Presentations 2.1, and Shell 4.0c)

For macOS only

Open source suites
 NeoOffice – a Mac-specific open-source software development project dedicated to integrating LibreOffice with native features of macOS. Current version (2023) is based on an old version of LibreOffice, 4.4 which was released mid-2014.

Proprietary suites
 iWork – Apple Inc.'s Mac-only office suite. Includes Pages for word-processing, Numbers for spreadsheets, and Keynote for presentations. iWork replaces the now-discontinued AppleWorks suite.
 Microsoft Office for Mac – Microsoft's office suite for macOS. Since Microsoft Office for Mac 2011, the suite requires an Intel-based Mac. Prior editions ran on both PowerPC systems and Intel based systems using Rosetta.

For Unix/Unix-like operating systems only

Free software suites
 AUIS – an office suite developed by Carnegie Mellon University and named after Andrew Carnegie
 Siag Office – a free office suite for Unix systems. Primarily written by programmer Ulric Erikkson, with contributions from other authors. Includes a word processor, a spreadsheet, and an animation program.

Proprietary suites
 Interleaf
 Aster*x

Mobile and tablet suites
Office suites for Android, BlackBerry, ChromeOS, iOS, iPadOS, Symbian, Windows Mobile, Windows Phone, and others. Used in smartphones, tablets and other mobile devices.

Open source suites
AndrOpen Office – a non-official port of Apache OpenOffice for Android
Collabora Online for mobile (Android, iOS, iPadOS and ChromeOS) is an enterprise-ready edition of LibreOffice

Proprietary suites
 Documents To Go (Android and others)
 iWork (iOS)
 Microsoft Office Mobile (Android, iOS and Windows Mobile/Phone)
 MobiSystems OfficeSuite (Android, iOS and Windows)
 Picsel Smart Office
 Polaris Office
 QuickOffice (Android, iOS and others)
 SoftMaker Office
 ThinkFree Office Mobile (Android)
 WPS Office, Free and complete office suite, includes writer, spreadsheet, presentations, enjoys the features of small-size, easy-to-use and compatible, covering multiple platforms including Windows, Linux, Android, iOS and Mac

Online (web-based) suites

Open source suites
 Collabora Online - enterprise-ready edition of LibreOffice, it will also integrate with NextCloud and others. Native apps for Windows, macOS, Linux, Android, iOS and ChromeOS, access files locally or connect to online storage servers.
Feng Office (formerly OpenGoo) – open source, fully featured online office suite. The application can be downloaded and installed on a server.
 ONLYOFFICE Community Server – open source online office suite that can be downloaded and deployed on a server
 Tiki Wiki CMS Groupware – full-featured web application, which includes a spreadsheet and webmail

Freeware suites
 Collabora Online Development Edition (CODE) – a free development edition of the corporate solution based on LibreOffice Technology 
 Google Docs Editors – Google Docs, Sheets, and Slides – an AJAX-based online office suite from Google. The suite includes a word processor, a spreadsheet program, and a presentation editor. Available free and as the enterprise service Google Workspace.
 ONLYOFFICE Personal – online office suite; combines text, spreadsheet and presentation editors
 Office Online – online office suite from Microsoft which is based on OneDrive. It includes a word processor, a spreadsheet, a presentation application and a notetaking program. Allow users to create, edit, save and share documents.
 Zoho Office Suite – free online office suite from Zoho Corporation. Includes a word processor, spreadsheet, presentations, and collaboration groupware.
 iWork for iCloud – a free-to-use but somewhat feature-limited online version of Apple's  iWorks office suite, accessible using both Mac and PC web browsers.

Proprietary suites
 ONLYOFFICE – online office suite integrated with document and project management toolset and CRM system. It includes a word processor, spreadsheet and presentation program written in HTML5 using Canvas.
 Simdesk – online office suite from Simdesk Technologies, Inc. This suite offers partial compatibility with the Microsoft Office file formats (Word, Excel, and Powerpoint). With a monthly subscription to Simdesk Services (costing $3.50 – $20 per month), one is allowed to install the application anywhere. (no longer available)
 ThinkFree Office – office suite written in Java, from ThinkFree, Inc. It includes a word processor (Write), a spreadsheet (Calc), and a presentation program (Show). For Microsoft Windows, Linux, and Mac OS X.

Discontinued office suites
 AppleWorks was released for the Apple II in 1984, then rewritten as ClarisWorks for the Apple IIGS (1988) and Macintosh (1991). ClarisWorks continued as AppleWorks after being bought by Apple, and GoBe Productive was developed using ideas from the original. Apple discontinued this suite after the release of iWork '08 in August 2007.
 Gobe Productive - the first office suite for BeOS, later ported to Microsoft Windows and Linux.
 IBM Lotus SmartSuite – for OS/2, Windows 9x, NT, 2000 and XP.
 IBM Lotus Symphony – freeware; based on OpenOffice.org
 IBM Works – an office suite for the IBM OS/2 operating system. It included word processing, spreadsheet, database and PIM applications.
 Jambo OpenOffice, an abandoned project to translate the OpenOffice.org project into Swahili.
 Lotus Jazz – Mac sister product to Lotus Symphony
 Lotus Symphony – Following the popularity of office suites made by competitors, the makers of the wildly popular Lotus 123, tried their hand at a suite for DOS. (The name Lotus was subsequently resurrected by IBM in September 2007 as IBM Lotus Symphony before that too was discontinued)
 Microsoft Works – discontinued in 2009 and replaced by Microsoft Office 2010 Starter Edition. 4.0 is the last version for Mac.
 Open Access – integrated software by Software Products International (SPI)
 Q&A – featured a flat file database whose "intelligent assistant" could answer natural language questions, and integrated word processor
 StarOffice – discontinued except as part of paid Solaris licenses; continued as open source suite OpenOffice.org, which subsequent versions of StarOffice were based on

See also
 Comparison of office suites
 Online office suite
 Productivity_software
 List of word processors
 List of spreadsheet software
 List of presentation programs
 Comparison of word processors
 Comparison of spreadsheet software

References

Notes